The International Institute of Islamic Thought (IIIT) is a privately held non-profit organization in the United States founded by Ismail al-Faruqi and Anwar Ibrahim. It was established as a non-profit 501(c)(3) non-denominational organization in Pennsylvania in 1981, and its headquarters are in Herndon, Virginia, within the suburbs around Washington, DC. The stated objective of the group is to focus on conducting research in advancing education in Muslim societies and the publication, translation and teaching of the work through various means, with "the objectives of revival and reform of Islamic thought."

See also 
 Holy Land Foundation for Relief and Development
 Mahmoud Abu-Saud
 Jamal al Barzinji
 Ismail al-Faruqi
 Taha Jabir Alalwani
 Anwar Ibrahim
 Yaqub Mirza

References

Bibliography 
 Esposito, John L. (2004). Oxford Dictionary of Islam. Oxford University Press. .

External links 

 London, UK Office
 International Journal of Islamic Thoughts (IIITs)

Non-profit organizations based in Herndon, Virginia
Islamic charities based in the United States
Research institutes established in 1981
Faith and theology think tanks in the United States